DWGV (792 AM), broadcasting as GVAM 792, is a radio station owned and operated by GV Radios Network Corporation, a subsidiary of Apollo Broadcast Investors. The station's studio are located at the 4th Floor, PG Building, McArthur Highway, Barangay Balibago, and its transmitter is located at Sitio Target, Sapangbato, Angeles City. It is the only AM radio station in Pampanga. It operates daily from 5:00 AM to 12:00 MN.

Awards

References

Radio stations in Angeles City
Radio stations established in 1996